"Show Me Some Discipline" is a song recorded by Australian band Sunnyboys. It written by lead singer-guitarist, Jeremy Oxley and was released in June 1983 as the lead single of the band's third studio album, Get Some Fun. "Show Me Some Discipline" peaked at No. 44 on the Kent Music Report singles chart.

Track listing
7" vinyl
 Side A "Show Me Some Discipline" - 3:10
 Side B "Guts of Iron" - 3:50

Charts

Release history

References

1983 singles
1983 songs
Sunnyboys songs
Mushroom Records singles